Paul Hanley is the name of:
Paul Hanley (musician) (born 1964), English musician
Paul Hanley (tennis) (born 1977), Australian tennis player
Paul Hanley (Peyton Place), fictional character 
 Paul Hanley, comic book author